Duplex (initiated 2010 in Oslo, Norway) is a Norwegian jazz duo comprising Harald Lassen and Christian Meaas Svendsen.

Biography 
Saxophonist Lassen and bassist Svendsen collaborates in a series of settings, so it came natural when they decided to explore the duo formate. Duplex's repertoire ranges widely, and this to fully exploit the possibilities of this somewhat unorthodox format. The duo emphasizes a strong sense of freedom, but this freedom mainly involves passages within harmonic structures. The most interesting part is the approach to this material, and working to combine jazz tradition with European music.

Personnel 
Harald Lassen – saxophones
Christian Meaas Svendsen – upright bass

Discography 
2013: Duolia (NorCD)
2013: Sketches Of ... (NorCD)
2015: Èn (NorCD)

References

External links 

Norwegian jazz ensembles
Norwegian experimental musical groups
Musical groups established in 2010
Musical groups from Oslo
2010 establishments in Norway